Gowmazi Jari (also Romanized as Gowmāzī Jārī; also known as Bāzār Dād Khodā) is a village in Kambel-e Soleyman Rural District, in the Central District of Chabahar County, Sistan and Baluchestan Province, Iran. At the 2006 census, its population was 78, in 14 families.

References 

Populated places in Chabahar County